Mana Po is a Philippine romantic-drama comedy TV series aired by ABS-CBN.  It is the 14th installment of the Precious Hearts Romances Presents series. It aired from February 21, 2011, to April 1, 2011, replacing Juanita Banana and was replaced by Frijolito.

Synopsis
How far will you go to get back something you think is rightfully yours? What will you do when your family's riches are inherited by someone you don't even know?

Brandi Dela Paz has made it her mission to reclaim the inheritance that is supposed to be hers. She will have to make the heir Milosebio "Milo" Kiping fall in love with her.

Before her father Vino died, he decided to correct his mistakes by giving everything that he owns to the son of his best friend Jack, whom he betrayed from way back when he kept and claimed the winnings from a sweepstakes ticket. His family lived a luxurious life, enjoying a fortune that isn't rightfully theirs, thus he made sure he can give back to Jack what he stole when the time of his death arrives.

Unexpectedly, Brandi did not like her father's revelations and is determined to fight for her right to the money and the family's company.

Will she succeed in her tricky and deceitful plan? Will she hit the jackpot and reclaim the fortune? Or will she give it all up and instead choose Milo's heart as a consolation prize?

Cast and characters

Main cast
Melai Cantiveros as Brandi Dela Paz
 Jason Francisco as Milosebio Jesus "Milo" Kiping
 Tom Rodriguez as Johnny Santos
 Megan Young as Winnie

Supporting cast
 RR Enriquez as Weng
 Johan Santos as Red Kiping
 Buboy Garovillo as Jack Kiping
 Giselle Sanchez as Jennifer "Ginny" Kiping
 Toby Alejar as Atty. Henry Chivas Miller
 Gilleth Sandico as Annie Rossi
 Quintin Alianza as Yakki Kiping
 Alex Castro as Bob
 Beatriz Saw as Sugar
 Josef Elizalde as Mompo
 John Arcilla as Vino Dela Paz
 Rachel Lobangco as Shirley Dela Paz
 Led Sobrepeña III as Vavushka

Special participation
 Marion Dela Cruz as Young Vino
 Kiray Celis as Young Brandi
 Kitkat as Young Jennifer

See also
Precious Hearts Romances Presents
List of ABS-CBN drama series

References

External links
 

ABS-CBN drama series
Philippine romantic comedy television series
2011 Philippine television series debuts
2011 Philippine television series endings
Filipino-language television shows
Television shows set in the Philippines